Project Runway Season 13 is the thirteenth season of the television show Project Runway, appearing on Lifetime. The season began airing on July 24, 2014, with 19 designers competing to become "the next great American designer." In addition, Amanda Valentine, a designer from Season 11, returned to compete once again for the grand prize. Valentine was voted back by fans in an online poll, winning against Alexander Pope and Ken Laurence, both of Season 12.

Supermodel Heidi Klum, Marie Claire creative director Nina Garcia, and fashion designer Zac Posen all returned as judges this season. Tim Gunn maintained his role as the workroom mentor.

Aldo was the exclusive retail sponsor for Project Runway's 13th season and has merchandised the accessory wall with an assortment of products.

In 2016, Fäde zu Grau, Mitchell Perry, Emily Payne and Kini Zamora competed on Project Runway All Stars (season 5), with Fäde placing 13th, Mitchell placing 10th, Emily placing 5th, and Kini being the runner-up.

In 2018, Amanda Valentine and Char Glover competed on Project Runway All Stars (season 6), with Amanda placing 11th and Char placing 10th of 16.

In 2019, Sean Kelly competed on Project Runway All Stars (season 7) against worldwide Project Runway winners where he placed 7th.

Designers 
Sources:

*Amanda Valentine, designer in Season 11 was voted back by fans to this season.

Designer Progress 

: In episode 1, Tim Navarro, Nzinga Knight, and Emmanuel Tobias were the 3 designers who were eliminated before the final 16 were officially participants of the show.
: In episode 2, the judges thought Sandhya had the weakest look on her team, which had the lowest score. She could have gone home if she didn't have immunity. They also told Angela that her team could have won if her look had not pulled down their score.
: In episode 3, Heidi stated that Amanda was lucky to have immunity because none of the judges liked her look.
: In episode 7, Tim Gunn decided to retroactively use his "Tim Gunn Save" on Char, canceling out her elimination in episode 6.
: In episode 12, there was no winner announced in the challenge.  Heidi only announced that Kini, Sean, Amanda and Char will go to fashion week.  But the critique shows the judges like the work by Kini, Sean and Amanda.

 The designer won Project Runway Season 13.
 The designer advanced to Fashion Week.
 The designer won the challenge.
 The designer came in second but did not win the challenge.
 The designer had one of the highest scores for that challenge, but did not win.
 The designer had one of the lowest scores for that challenge, but was not eliminated.
 The designer was in the bottom two, but was not eliminated.
 The designer lost and was eliminated from the competition.
 The designer lost, but was brought back to the competition by Tim Gunn.
 The designer failed in the final auditions.

: In episode 7, Bella replaces Christabel.  Previews show Bella continuing.
In episode 9 & 10, the models were not needed in the challenge.

 The model won Project Runway Season 13.
 The model wore the winning design that challenge.
 The model wore the design that came in second.
 The model wore the design with one of the highest scores.
 The model wore the design that had one of the lowest scores.
 The model wore the design that landed in the bottom two.
 The model wore the losing design that challenge.
 The model was eliminated.
 The model was out, but was brought back.

Models
Alexandria Serafini
Alisar Ailabouni
Angelica Guillen-Jimenez
Brianna Mellon
Christabel Campbell
Jasmine Rivers
Jasmine Agnew
Lea Mihevc
Nea McLin
Nikola Anderson
Bella Davis
DJ Smith
Ashley Rossi
Rachel McCray
Ploy Supawetvehon
Camille Annise-Lewis

Designer Legend
Alexander Knox: AK
Amanda Valentine: AV
Angela Sum: AS
Carrie Sleutskaya: CS
Char Glover: CG
Emily Payne: EP
Fäde Zu Grau: FG
Hernan Lander: HL
Jefferson Musanda: JM
Kini Zamora: KZ
Korina Emmerich: KE
Kristine Guico: KG
Mitchell Perry: MP
Samantha Plasencia: SP
Sandhya Garg: SG
Sean Kelly: SK

Episodes

Episode 0: Road to the Runway 
Original airdate: July 24, 2014

 This was a special episode during which Tim Gunn shared how the Season 13 designers were chosen. First there was a nationwide casting call where hundreds of aspiring ones submitted their portfolios and home videos. From there the most promising designers were invited to audition before a panel of judges which included Gunn and Project Runway alums Mondo Guerra (Season 8 runner-up and winner of the first PR: All Stars), Laura Kathleen Planck (Season 9), Anthony Ryan Auld (Season 9 and winner of the second PR: All Stars), Nick Verreos (Season 2 and winning mentor on Under the Gunn) and Dmitry Sholokhov (Season 10 winner). Eighteen designers were selected for the final audition on Episode 1. Of note is that Emily, Kini, Korina and Tim had unsuccessfully tried out for past seasons of PR.

Episode 1: The Judges Decide 
Original airdate: July 24, 2014

 On the Season 13 opener the 18 designers selected pre-season must face one final audition before landing one of 15 coveted spots on the series. We then learn that Amanda Valentine from Season 11 is the #RunwayRedemption winner having received more fan votes than both Ken Lawrence and Alexander Pope from Season 12.
 For the Episode 1 challenge the 16 designers were given a trunk of six random fabrics and tasked with creating a look that would represent their spring collection if they made it to New York Fashion Week. Each designer was allowed to barter and exchange fabric with the other designers. The winner received immunity.
 Guest Judge: Julie Bowen
 WINNER: Sandhya
 ELIMINATED: Tim, Nzinga and Emmanuel after the final audition -and- Jefferson for the Episode 1 challenge

Episode 2: Unconventional Movie Nite 
Original airdate: July 31, 2014

 The designers visit a local movie theater, then must produce a look from unconventional materials found in the theater and on a movie set. The designers worked in teams of 3 to create a cohesive mini-collection.

 Guest Judge: Garance Doré
 WINNER: Amanda
 ELIMINATED: Carrie

Episode 3: Welcome to the Future 
Original airdate: August 7, 2014

 The designers use their past memories to create a look for the future and can be photographed in Marie Claire Magazine in the next 20 years.
 Guest Judge:Anne Fulenwider & Amanda de Cadenet
 WINNER: Sandhya
 ELIMINATED: Angela

Episode 4: A Suitable Twist 
Original airdate: August 14, 2014

 This was the Red Robin Challenge. The designers must revamp men's vintage suits to create looks for the modern woman. Since Sandhya won the last challenge, she got to choose her suit first. Then she got to choose every suit for every person. Many were happy and some were upset, especially Hernan and Mitchell.
 Guest Judge: Bethany Mota
 WINNER: Amanda
 ELIMINATED:  Hernan

Episode 5: The Klum of Doom 
Original airdate: August 21, 2014

 The designers fashion a look for host Heidi Klum to wear to the Emmys. When Heidi and Tim made the trips around the workroom, Heidi was not satisfied. Heidi then allowed the designers to go to Mood to buy more fabric to revamp or redo their garments.
 Guest Judge: Lindsey Vonn
 WINNER: Sean
 ELIMINATED: Mitchell and Kristine

Episode 6: Rock the Wedding 
Original airdate: August 28, 2014

 The designers working in pairs to create unconventional wedding dresses and reception looks.
 Guest Judge: Dita Von Teese & Chiara Ferragni
 WINNER: Sean
 ELIMINATED: Char

Episode 7: Priceless Runway 
Original airdate: September 4, 2014

 Pieces of Chopard jewelry inspire looks. Also: The designers visit a museum exhibit featuring the work of designer Charles James. Tim uses his 'Tim Gunn Save' to bring back Char, after having not done so immediately following her elimination from the competition the previous week.
 Guest Judge: Caroline Scheufele
 SAVED: Char
 WINNER: Korina
 ELIMINATED: Samantha

Episode 8: The Rainway 
Original airdate: September 11, 2014

 The designers create avant-garde styles that must stand up to the elements, particularly rain.
 Guest Judge: Caitlin FitzGerald
 WINNER: Sean & Kini
 ELIMINATED: Fäde

Episode 9: American Girl Doll 
Original airdate: September 18, 2014

 The designers try to deliver stylish, age-appropriate looks inspired by American Girl dolls.
 Guest Judge: Elisabeth Moss & Heather Northrop
 WINNER: Kini
 ELIMINATED: Sandhya

Episode 10: Muse on the Street 
Original airdate: September 25, 2014

 The clothiers seek their muse in the form of a complete stranger found on the streets of New York City. Here, they must convince the muses to undergo makeovers while creating looks for them.
 Guest Judge: Asha Leo & Michelle Monaghan
 WINNER: Korina
 ELIMINATED: Alexander

Episode 11: The Highest Bidder 
Original airdate: October 2, 2014

 The designers pair up into teams of two and bid on storage containers. They must make three looks from the contents. After winner and "safes" are revealed, Bottom 2 are given one hour to create a new garment from scratch.
 Guest Judge: Christian Siriano
 WINNER: Kini
 ELIMINATED: Korina

Episode 12: Fashion Week: Who's In & Who's Out 
Original airdate: October 9, 2014

 The competition heats up when a challenge determines which contestants will go to Fashion Week. Dual challenges include a street-inspired look and refashioning a losing look from previous weeks. Included: Eliminated designers return to the workroom. 
 Guest Judge: Shay Mitchell
 ADVANCED TO FASHION WEEK: Kini, Sean, Amanda, Char
 ELIMINATED: Emily

Episode 13: Finale, Part 1 
Original airdate: October 16, 2014

 In Part 1 of the two-part Season 13 finale, the designers head to Rome with Tim Gunn for inspiration and to shop for fabric.
 Guest Judge: None

Episode 14: Finale, Part 2 
Original airdate: October 23, 2014

  In the conclusion of the two-part Season 13 finale, the still-standing designers present their collections at New York Fashion Week, after which the winner is named.
 Guest Judge: Emmy Rossum
 WINNER: Sean
 ELIMINATED: Amanda (2nd place), Kini (3rd place), Char (4th place)

Episode 15: Reunion 
Original airdate: October 30, 2014

References

External links 

Season 13
2014 American television seasons
2014 in fashion